Sunde may refer to:

Places
 Sunde, Holsnøy, Hordaland, a sound in Alver municipality in Vestland county, Norway
 Sunde, Kvinnherad, a village in Kvinnherad municipality in Vestland county, Norway
 Sunde, Matre, a village in Kvinnherad municipality in Vestland county, Norway
 Sunde, Stavanger, a neighborhood in the city of Stavanger in Rogaland county, Norway
 Sunde, Sunnfjord, a village in Sunnfjord municipality in Vestland county, Norway
 Sunde, Telemark, a village in Midt-Telemark municipality in Vestfold og Telemark county, Norway
 Sunde, Trøndelag, a village in Hitra municipality in Trøndelag county, Norway

People
Arne Sunde (1883-1972), a Norwegian politician, Olympic shooter and army officer
Arnulf Sunde (born 1951), a former speed skater from Norway, who represented his native country at the 1976 Winter Olympics
Asbjørn Sunde (1909-1985), a Norwegian politician for the Communist Party of Norway
Elias Sunde (1851-1910), a Norwegian politician
Fern Blodgett Sunde (1918-1991), Canadian wireless radio operator
Harald Sunde (disambiguation), a list of people named Harald Sunde
Helge Sunde (born 1965), a Norwegian composer and musician (trombone and multi-instrumentalist)
Hjalmar Inge Sunde (born 1937), a Norwegian military officer and former county governor
Milt Sunde (born 1942), a guard who played for the Minnesota Vikings in the National Football League
Olaf Sunde (1915-1981), a Norwegian lawyer and workers' rights activist
Olav Sunde (1903-1985), a javelin thrower from Oslo, Norway
Ole Robert Sunde (born 1952), a Norwegian poet, novelist and essayist
Paul Tjøstolsen Sunde (1896-1958), a Norwegian politician for the Labour Party
Per Martin Sunde (born 1944), a Norwegian alpine skier
Peter Sunde (born 1978), a politician, computer expert, and spokesperson with Norwegian and Finnish ancestry
Sarah Cameron Sunde, an American theatrical director and translator based in New York City
Siri Sunde (born 1958), a Norwegian priest
Torbjørn Sunde (born 1954), a Norwegian jazz musician (trombone)
Åslaug Linge Sunde (1917-2006), a Norwegian politician for the Liberal Party
Øystein Sunde (born 1947), a Norwegian folk singer and guitarist

Other
O. N. Sunde, a Norwegian holding company

See also
Sund (disambiguation)
Sünde

Norwegian-language surnames